Ludwig Carl Christian Gisbert Friedrich von Bodelschwingh auf Velmede (10 December 1800 – 12 May 1873) was a Prussian politician.

Von Bodelschwingh-Velmede was born in Velmede, near Hamm in the County of Mark as the son of Franz Christoph Gisbert Friedrich Wilhelm von Bodelschwingh, Herr auf Velmede (1754–1827) and his wife Friederike Charlotte Sophie Wilhelmine Henriette von Bodelschwingh, née Freiin von Plettenberg. After serving as a one-year volunteer in the Guards Rifles Battalion he studied law, and then entered public life, serving in a string of posts from 1837–45: as Landtag in Hamm, Oberregierungsrat in Minden, vice-president of the Regierungsbezirk of Münster, and president of the Regierungsbezirk of Arnsberg.

In 1849 he entered politics at the Prussian level, entering the Abgeordnetenhaus (the Prussian lower house) as a conservative delegate. He served as Finance Minister from 1851–58 under Otto Theodor von Manteuffel and again from 1862–66 under Otto von Bismarck. He resigned in 1866 from an unwillingness to take on the responsibility of procuring funds for the Austro-Prussian War.

His brother, Ernst von Bodelschwingh-Velmede, was also active in Prussian politics.

References
 

1800 births
1873 deaths
People from Hamm
People from the County of Mark
German Protestants
German Conservative Party politicians
Finance ministers of Prussia
Members of the Prussian House of Representatives
Members of the 1st Reichstag of the German Empire